Gentlemen Take Polaroids is the fourth studio album by the English band Japan, released in November 1980 by Virgin Records.

Background 
Gentlemen Take Polaroids was the band's first album for the Virgin Records label after leaving Hansa-Ariola, which had released their first three albums. It continued in the vein of their previous album Quiet Life, drawing on its elegant Euro-disco stylings coupled with more ambitious arrangements. In a 1982 interview, David Sylvian commented that by the time of this album, he had become a "paranoid perfectionist" and that he had come to dominate the band's recording sessions, forcing the other members to comply with his vision which ultimately led to the band's break up - a situation he took some responsibility for (he considers 1979's Quiet Life to be the only album which the band worked on in a truly collaborative manner). This was the last Japan album to feature guitarist Rob Dean, who left the band in spring 1981. Dean took little part in the recording of the album and was only occasionally called in by the band to add guitar.  

Lyrically the songs were also a continuation of themes on the previous album, such as travel and escape to foreign climes in the song "Swing", while the lyrics of "Nightporter" introduced a more introspective nature of Sylvian's songwriting. "Taking Islands in Africa", the title of which was taken from a line in "Swing", was a collaboration with Ryuichi Sakamoto, who was given a songwriting credit for the track.

The album was completed in two months. The band and producer John Punter worked meticulously on the arrangements with multiple takes on each instrument and the master edited from different takes. Some of the songs such as "My New Career" and "Taking Islands in Africa" were written in the studio.  

There was an unreleased song still sitting in the vaults from the sessions for this album; "Some Kind Of Fool" (which Sylvian re-recorded the vocals for and released on "Everything and Nothing"). Rob Dean remembers in an interview by Chi Ming Lai and Paul Boddy 2019:
Ann O'Dell's strings were added and it was at that point that David decided not to pursue recording it further, the main reason being I believe, that with the strings, it began to resemble "The Other Side Of Life" too closely arrangement-wise which actually I can see was a very valid point. Ironically the JAPAN version with a couple of embellishments and a re-recorded vocal eventually found its way onto the Sylvian compilation "Everything and Nothing" but under his name alone, rather unfairly. Surprisingly, the guitar parts which I struggled over remain intact too. Anyone listening to this is essentially listening to an updated version of the original JAPAN band version.

At the beginning of the recording sessions the band also rehearsed an unfinished song called "Angel in Furs", but it is unclear if a recording exists. The guitar melody of the song is said to have been used as the vocal melody of "My New Career".

Release 
The album was preceded by the release of the title track as a single in October 1980, which peaked at number 60 in the UK Singles Chart, the group's first single to chart.

The album itself was moderately successful in the UK on its release. It peaked at number 51, but re-entered the chart in 1982 and was later certified gold by the British Phonographic Industry in 1986 for 100,000 copies sold.

No further singles were immediately taken from the album, though "Nightporter" (influenced by the works of French composer Erik Satie, most particularly his Gymnopedies) was remixed and released as a single in November 1982, just after the band announced that they were breaking up. It peaked at number 29 in the UK Singles Chart, though both the edited 7" version and the full-length 12" remix remain unreleased on CD to this day.

The album was reissued in 2003, with slightly different cover art (taken from the same photo session as the original cover) and three bonus tracks; the instrumentals "The Width of a Room" (the only track in the band's catalogue composed by guitarist Rob Dean) and "The Experience of Swimming", composed by Richard Barbieri. Both tracks were originally B-sides to the "Gentlemen Take Polaroids" double 7" single, but were also used on later singles. The third bonus track was "Taking Islands In Africa", a Steve Nye-remixed version from 1981 originally released as the B-side of the "Visions Of China" 7" single.

On 24 August 2018, two new half-speed-mastered vinyl pressings were released; a single 33rpm version and a deluxe double 45rpm version, both mastered by Miles Showell at Abbey Road Studios. For the first time all lyrics were printed inside the gatefold of the deluxe version and the cover art had cropped the band name and title with the original photograph now covering the whole surface.

Reception 

Gentlemen Take Polaroids has been well received by some critics. Writing in Smash Hits magazine in November 1980, Steve Taylor said: "If Brian Eno, rather than Bryan Ferry, had rerouted the original direction of Roxy Music, this might well have been the result..."

However, other contemporary critics were unimpressed. NMEs Paul Du Noyer and Melody Makers Patrick Humphries both saw Japan as Roxy Music imitators. Du Noyer said: "If only Japan's music was as eloquent as it's elegant... they lavish tender loving care on the surface sound – a beautifully polished, empty shell of a sound." Humphries expressed a similar opinion: "There's something infinitely unsatisfying about this album. From the false image of the band to the hollow songs they perform."

In his retrospective review, Ned Raggett of AllMusic called it "unquestionably the album in which Japan truly found its own unique voice and aesthetic approach." Joseph Burnett of The Quietus wrote that the album "took the sound of Quiet Life and refined it into a series of oblique, almost cinematic avant-pop creations that exquisitely surround the frontman's woozy post-Bryan Ferry croon in layers of pop textures that sounded like little else by Japan's contemporaries." Trouser Press called it an "excellent" album whose "technically exquisite and musically adventurous sound is loaded with atmosphere, yet displays a very light touch."

Track listing 

† The track "Burning Bridges" was put on the album as a last-minute replacement for a track titled "Some Kind of Fool", with quite a lot of UK and German pressings of the album listing the latter song on the inner sleeve and on the track listings. "Some Kind of Fool" was also going to be released as a single in 1982, but was replaced by "Nightporter". An overdubbed version with new lyrics was released on Sylvian's solo album Everything and Nothing in 2000, but the original Japan version has never been released.

Singles

Personnel 

 Japan
 David Sylvian – vocals, synthesizers (ARP Omni, Oberheim OB-X, Minimoog, Roland System 700), piano, electric guitar
 Mick Karn – fretless bass guitar, oboe, saxophone, recorder
 Steve Jansen – drums, synthesizer (Roland System 700, Sequential Circuits Prophet 5), percussion
 Richard Barbieri – synthesizers (Roland System 700, Micromoog, Polymoog, Prophet 5, Oberheim OB-X, Roland Jupiter 4), sequencer, piano
 Rob Dean – guitar, ebow

 Additional personnel
 Ryuichi Sakamoto – synthesizers
 Simon House – violin on "My New Career"
 Cyo – vocals on "Methods of Dance"
 Barry Guy – double bass
 Andrew Cauthery – oboe

 Technical
 John Punter – production, mixing, recording, engineering
 Colin Fairley – recording, engineering
 Nigel Walker – recording, engineering
 Steve Prestage – recording, engineering
 Nicola Tyson – back cover
 Stuart McLeod – front cover

Charts

Certifications

References

External links 
 

Japan (band) albums
1980 albums
Albums produced by John Punter
Virgin Records albums
Avant-pop albums